Butterfly Dreams is the second studio album by Brazilian jazz singer Flora Purim. It was released in 1973 via Milestone Records. Recording sessions took place at Fantasy Studios in Berkeley, California in December 1973.

Reception

In a review for AllMusic, Jim Newsom wrote: "Neatly capturing Flora Purim's many vocal strengths, Butterfly Dreams delivered on the great expectations generated by her work with Corea and turned out to be a high point in her recording career."

John Kelman of All About Jazz called the album "a diverse record that in its brief 37 minutes, affirms Purim's position as one of the most important musical voices to emerge from that era."

Writing for New Directions in Music, Marshall Bowden commented: "There is a freshness to [Purim's] voice here that is not always evident in later work... It doesn’t hurt that her collaborators here are among her most sympathetic... For those who enjoy light-sounding (as opposed to light on musical ideas) fusion tinged with Latin elements and airy, roomy vocalization, Butterfly Dreams is the perfect ticket."

Track listing

Personnel 
 Flora Purim – vocals, arrangement (track 3)
George Duke – electric piano (tracks: 1-3, 5-8), ARP synthesizer (tracks: 1, 4, 6, 8), clavinet (tracks: 1, 7), piano (track 4), arrangement (track 5)
David Amaro – electric guitar (tracks: 1, 3, 7, 8), acoustic guitar (tracks: 4-6)
 Stanley Clarke – Fender electric bass (tracks: 1, 3, 7), acoustic bass (tracks: 2, 4-6, 8), arrangement (tracks: 1, 2, 4, 6-8)
Ernie Hood – zither (tracks: 4, 6-8)
 Joe Henderson – flute (tracks: 1, 8), tenor saxophone (tracks: 2, 4, 5, 8)
Airto Moreira – drums, percussion
Technical
Orrin Keepnews – producer
Jim Stern – engineering
Eddie Bill Harris – engineering
David Turner – mastering
Anthony Samuel Lane – art direction, design, photography

References

External links

Flora's Recordings on her website
Butterfly Dreams by Flora Purim on iTunes

1973 albums
Flora Purim albums
Milestone Records albums
Albums produced by Orrin Keepnews